Berth  or berthing may refer to:

Transport 
 Berthing, a cabin on a ship or train
 Berthing (spacecraft), the placement of a spacecraft into a berthing mechanism through the use of a robotic arm
 Berth (moorings)
 Berth (sleeping)

Other uses 
 Berth (album), an album by The Used

See also 
 Birth (disambiguation)
 Childbirth